Zohra Opoku (born 1976) is a textile visual artist based in Accra.

Bibliography

External links 

 

1976 births
German artists
Ghanaian artists
Living people